The Time Is Now may refer to:

Music

Albums
 The Time Is Now (album), by Craig David, 2018
 The Time Is Now, by DJ Antoine, 2018
 The Time Is Now, by So Solid Crew, 2006

Songs
 "The Time Is Now" (John Cena song), 2005
 "The Time Is Now" (Moloko song), 2000
 "The Time Is Now", by Atreyu from In Our Wake, 2018
 "The Time Is Now", by Capsule from More! More! More!, 2008
 "The Time Is Now", by Giriboy, 2019
 "The Time Is Now", by the Golddiggers, used in the soundtrack for the film The Irishman, 2019
 "The Time Is Now", by Neil Diamond, the B-side of "Kentucky Woman", 1967
 "The Time Is Now", by Valanto Trifonos competing to represent Greece in the Eurovision Song Contest 2011

Television episodes
 "The Time Is Now" (Criminal Minds: Suspect Behavior), 2011
 "The Time Is Now" (Millennium), 1998
 "The Time Is Now" (The Name of the Game), 1970

Other uses
 The Time Is Now (radio program), a former program on Air America Radio
 The Time Is Now, a 2019 book by Joan Chittister

See also
 Now Is the Time (disambiguation)